Royal can be a surname or a given name. Bearers include:

Surname
 Billy Joe Royal (1942–2015), American country music and pop singer
 Calvin Royal III, American ballet dancer
 Darrell Royal (1924–2012), former football coach and player
 Donald Royal (born 1966), retired National Basketball Association player
 Doyle P. Royal (1919–2020), American tennis and soccer coach
 Eddie Royal (born 1985), National Football League player
 Ernie Royal (1921–1983), American jazz trumpeter
 Frank S. Royal (born c. 1940), American physician, company director and civic leader
 Jesse Royal (born 1980), New Zealand rugby league player
 Marshal Royal (1912–1995), American clarinetist and alto saxophonist
 Robert Royal (born 1979), National Football League player
 Ségolène Royal (born 1953), French socialist politician
 William R. Royal (1905–1997), American underwater diver

Given name
 Roy Castleton (1885–1967), American Major League Baseball relief pitcher, first Mormon in the major leagues
 Royal Dano (1922–1994), American actor
 Royal Galipeau (1947–2018), Canadian Conservative Member of Parliament
 Royal Harbor (born 1975), stage name Knoc-turn'al, American songwriter and rapper
 Royal Ivey (born 1981), American basketball player
 Royal Wade Kimes (born 1951), American country music singer
 Royal Little (1896–1989), American businessman considered the father of conglomerates
 Royal Robbins (1935–2017), American rock climbing pioneer
 Royal Robertson (1936–1997), American artist 
 Royal Skousen (born 1945), American professor of linguistics and English
 Royal Sprague (1814–1872), 11th Chief Justice of California
 Royal A. Stone (1875–1942), Minnesota Supreme Court justice

See also
 Royle, a list of people and fictional characters with the surname
 Royle Stillman (born 1951), former Major League Baseball player

English-language masculine given names